Zonhoven is a municipality located in the Belgian province of Limburg near Hasselt. On January 1, 2018, Zonhoven had a total population of 21,214. The total area is 39.34 km2 which gives a population density of 506 inhabitants per km2.

The municipality includes the hamlets Halveweg, Termolen, and Terdonk.

History 
On November 18, 1833, the Treaty of Zonhoven was signed in the house named De Franse Kroon between representatives of the Netherlands and Belgium to establish special regulations over the use of the river Meuse by the signatories.

Notable persons born/raised in Zonhoven
  (1954-2001), author and illustrator of children's books
  (1985), Multiple Sclerosis researcher/scientist
  (b. Maasmechelen, 1980), VJ and radio personality
  (1977), frontman of Zornik
  (b. Hasselt, 1972), athlete
  (b. Hasselt, 1965) aka Pat Krimson, ex-Leopold 3, frontman of 2 Fabiola, DJ and producer
 Bert Dries (Musketon) (1989), Award Winning Graphic Designer
 Luc Indestege, (1901-1974) writer
 , former boyband
 Ingrid Lieten (b. Hasselt 1964), Flemish minister
 Luc Nilis (1967), former soccer player
 Roel Paulissen (b. Hasselt 1976), mountain biking
 Marleen Renders (b. Diest 1968), marathon runner
  (1988), actress
  (1954), actress, sister of Leah Thys
  (1945), actress, sister of Chris Thys
 Pierre Vanbrabant (2007), musician
 Jos Vandeloo (1925-2015), writer
  (1941), former MOP, former mayor of Zonhoven
  (b. Hasselt, 1967), writer
 Tim Vanhamel (1977), frontman of Millionaire and ex-Evil Superstars
 Francesca Vanthielen (b. Eeklo, 1972), actress, host
 Wout Wijsmans (b. Hasselt, 1977), volleyball player

Products of Zonhoven
  Belgian beer

Sports

Superprestige round #2 Zonhoven is a 
cyclo-cross race held every autumn.

Gallery

References

External links

 
Newssite 

Municipalities of Limburg (Belgium)